The Southsiders (Swedish: Söderkåkar) is a 1932 Swedish comedy film directed by Weyler Hildebrand and starring Gideon Wahlberg, Dagmar Ebbesen and Björn Berglund. It is set on the southern side of Stockholm.

Cast

References

Bibliography 
 Gunnar Iverson, Astrid Soderbergh Widding & Tytti Soila. Nordic National Cinemas. Routledge, 2005.

External links 
 

1932 films
Swedish comedy films
1932 comedy films
1930s Swedish-language films
Films directed by Weyler Hildebrand
Films set in Stockholm
Swedish black-and-white films
1930s Swedish films